The following is a list of nerves in the human body:

Location

 Structure of the nervous system
 Development of the nervous system
 The spinal cord or medulla spinalis
 The brain or encephalon
 The hindbrain or rhombencephalon
 The midbrain or mesencephalon
 The forebrain or prosencephalon
 Composition and central connections of the spinal nerves
 Pathways from the brain to the spinal cord
 The meninges of the brain and medulla spinalis
 The cerebrospinal fluid
 The cranial nerves
 The olfactory nerves
 The optic nerve
 The oculomotor nerve
 The trochlear nerve
 The trigeminal nerve
 The abducens nerve
 The facial nerve
 The vestibulocochlear nerve
 The glossopharyngeal nerve
 The vagus nerve
 The accessory nerve
 The hypoglossal nerve
 The spinal nerves
 The posterior divisions
 The anterior divisions
 The thoracic nerves
 The lumbosacral plexus
 The sacral and coccygeal nerves
 The sympathetic nerves
 The cephalic portion of the sympathetic system
 The cervical portion of the sympathetic system
 The thoracic portion of the sympathetic system
 The abdominal portion of the sympathetic system
 The pelvic portion of the sympathetic system
 The great plexuses of the sympathetic system

Alphabetical list
 Abdominal aortic plexus
 Abducens nerve
 Accessory nerve
 Accessory obturator nerve
 Alderman's nerve
 Anococcygeal nerve
 Ansa cervicalis
 Anterior interosseous nerve
 Anterior superior alveolar nerve
 Auerbach's plexus
 Auriculotemporal nerve
 Axillary nerve
 Brachial plexus
 Buccal branch of the facial nerve
 Buccal nerve
 Cardiac plexus
 Cavernous nerves
 Cavernous plexus
 Celiac ganglia
 Cervical branch of the facial nerve
 Cervical plexus
 Chorda tympani
 Ciliary ganglion
 Coccygeal nerve
 Cochlear nerve
 Common fibular nerve
 Common palmar digital nerves of median nerve
 Deep branch of the radial nerve
 Deep fibular nerve
 Deep petrosal nerve
 Deep temporal nerves
 Diagonal band of Broca
 Digastric branch of facial nerve
 Dorsal branch of ulnar nerve
 Dorsal nerve of clitoris
 Dorsal nerve of the penis
 Dorsal scapular nerve
 Esophageal plexus
 Ethmoidal nerves
 External laryngeal nerve
 External nasal nerve
 Facial nerve
 Femoral nerve
 Frontal nerve
 Gastric plexuses
 Geniculate ganglion
 Genital branch of genitofemoral nerve
 Genitofemoral nerve
 Glossopharyngeal nerve
 Greater auricular nerve
 Greater occipital nerve
 Greater petrosal nerve
 Hepatic plexus
 Hypoglossal nerve
 Iliohypogastric nerve
 Ilioinguinal nerve
 Inferior alveolar nerve
 Inferior anal nerves
 Inferior cardiac nerve
 Inferior cervical ganglion
 Inferior gluteal nerve
 Inferior hypogastric plexus
 Inferior mesenteric plexus
 Inferior palpebral nerve
 Infraorbital nerve
 Infraorbital plexus
 Infratrochlear nerve
 Intercostal nerves
 Intercostobrachial nerve
 Intermediate cutaneous nerve
 Internal carotid plexus
 Internal laryngeal nerve
 Interneuron
 Jugular ganglion
 Lacrimal nerve
 Lateral cord
 Lateral cutaneous nerve of forearm
 Lateral cutaneous nerve of thigh
 Lateral pectoral nerve
 Lateral plantar nerve
 Lateral pterygoid nerve
 Lesser occipital nerve
 Lingual nerve
 Long ciliary nerves
 Long root of the ciliary ganglion
 Long thoracic nerve
 Lower subscapular nerve
 Lumbar nerves
 Lumbar plexus
 Lumbar splanchnic nerves
 Lumboinguinal nerve
 Lumbosacral plexus
 Lumbosacral trunk
 Mandibular nerve
 Marginal mandibular branch of facial nerve
 Masseteric nerve
 Maxillary nerve
 Medial cord
 Medial cutaneous nerve of arm
 Medial cutaneous nerve of forearm
 Medial cutaneous nerve
 Medial pectoral nerve
 Medial plantar nerve
 Medial pterygoid nerve
 Median nerve
 Meissner's plexus
 Mental nerve
 Middle cardiac nerve
 Middle cervical ganglion
 Middle meningeal nerve
 Motor nerve
 Muscular branches of the radial nerve
 Musculocutaneous nerve
 Mylohyoid nerve
 Nasociliary nerve
 Nasopalatine nerve
 Nerve of pterygoid canal
 Nerve to obturator internus
 Nerve to quadratus femoris
 Nerve to the Piriformis
 Nerve to the stapedius
 Nerve to the subclavius
 Nervus intermedius
 Nervus spinosus
 Nodose ganglion
 Obturator nerve
 Oculomotor nerve
 Olfactory nerve
 Ophthalmic nerve
 Optic nerve
 Otic ganglion
 Ovarian plexus
 Palatine nerves
 Palmar branch of the median nerve
 Palmar branch of ulnar nerve
 Pancreatic plexus
 Patellar plexus
 Pelvic splanchnic nerves
 Perforating cutaneous nerve
 Perineal branches of posterior femoral cutaneous nerve
 Perineal nerve
 Petrous ganglion
 Pharyngeal branch of vagus nerve
 Pharyngeal branches of glossopharyngeal nerve
 Pharyngeal nerve
 Pharyngeal plexus
 Phrenic nerve
 Phrenic plexus
 Posterior auricular nerve
 Posterior branch of spinal nerve
 Posterior cord
 Posterior cutaneous nerve of arm
 Posterior cutaneous nerve of forearm
 Posterior cutaneous nerve of thigh
 Posterior scrotal nerves
 Posterior superior alveolar nerve
 Proper palmar digital nerves of median nerve
 Prostatic plexus (nervous)
 Pterygopalatine ganglion
 Pudendal nerve
 Pudendal plexus
 Pulmonary branches of vagus nerve
 Radial nerve
 Recurrent laryngeal nerve
 Renal plexus
 Sacral plexus
 Sacral splanchnic nerves
 Saphenous nerve
 Sciatic nerve
 Semilunar ganglion
 Sensory nerve
 Short ciliary nerves
 Sphenopalatine nerves
 Splenic plexus
 Stylohyoid branch of facial nerve
 Subcostal nerve
 Submandibular ganglion
 Suboccipital nerve
 Superficial branch of the radial nerve
 Superficial fibular nerve
 Superior cardiac nerve
 Superior cervical ganglion
 Superior ganglion of glossopharyngeal nerve
 Superior ganglion of vagus nerve
 Superior gluteal nerve
 Superior hypogastric plexus
 Superior labial nerve
 Superior laryngeal nerve
 Superior lateral cutaneous nerve of arm
 Superior mesenteric plexus
 Superior rectal plexus
 Supraclavicular nerves
 Supraorbital nerve
 Suprarenal plexus
 Suprascapular nerve
 Supratrochlear nerve
 Sural nerve
 Sympathetic trunk
 Temporal branches of the facial nerve
 Third occipital nerve
 Thoracic aortic plexus
 Thoracic splanchnic nerves
 Thoraco-abdominal nerves
 Thoracodorsal nerve
 Tibial nerve
 Transverse cervical nerve
 Trigeminal nerve
 Trochlear nerve
 Tympanic nerve
 Ulnar nerve
 Upper subscapular nerve
 Uterovaginal plexus
 Vagus nerve
 Ventral ramus
 Vesical nervous plexus
 Vestibular nerve
 Vestibulocochlear nerve
 Zygomatic branches of facial nerve
 Zygomatic nerve
 Zygomaticofacial nerve
 Zygomaticotemporal nerve

Related topic
 Human brain
 Spinal cord
 Outline of the human nervous system
 List of skeletal muscles of the human body
 List of bones of the human skeleton
 Circulatory system
 Blood vessel

External links
 List of nerves

Peripheral nervous system

Nerves